"Rapper's Delight" is a 1979 hip-hop track by the Sugarhill Gang, produced by Sylvia Robinson. Although it was shortly preceded by the Fatback Band's "King Tim III (Personality Jock)", "Rapper's Delight" is credited for introducing hip-hop music to a wide audience, reaching the top 40 in the United States, as well as the top three in the United Kingdom and number one in Canada. It was a prototype for various types of rap music. The track interpolates Chic's "Good Times", resulting in Chic's Nile Rodgers and Bernard Edwards threatening to sue Sugar Hill Records for copyright infringement; a settlement was reached that gave the two songwriting credits. The track was recorded in a single take. There are five mixes of the song.

"Rapper's Delight" was ranked at number 251 on Rolling Stone magazine's list of the "500 Greatest Songs of All Time" in 2010, and number 2 on VH1's "100 Greatest Hip-Hop Songs". It is also included on NPR's list of the 100 most important American musical works of the 20th century. It was preserved in the National Recording Registry by the Library of Congress in 2011 for being "culturally, historically, or aesthetically significant".

In 2014, the record was inducted into the Grammy Hall of Fame.

Background
In late 1978, Debbie Harry suggested that Chic's Nile Rodgers join her and Chris Stein at a hip-hop event, which at the time was a communal space taken over by teenagers with boombox stereos playing various pieces of music that performers would break dance to. Rodgers experienced this event the first time himself at a high school in the Bronx. On September 20 and 21, 1979, Blondie and Chic were playing concerts with the Clash in New York at the Palladium. When Chic started playing "Good Times", rapper Fab Five Freddy and the members of the Sugarhill Gang ("Big Bank Hank" Jackson, "Wonder Mike" Wright, and "Master Gee" O'Brien), jumped up on stage and started freestyling with the band. A few weeks later, Rodgers was on the dance floor of New York club Leviticus and heard the DJ play a song which opened with Bernard Edwards's bass line from Chic's "Good Times". Rodgers approached the DJ who said he was playing a record he had just bought that day in Harlem. The song turned out to be an early version of "Rapper's Delight", which also included a scratched version of the song's string section. Rodgers and Edwards immediately threatened legal action over copyright, which resulted in a settlement and their being credited as co-writers. Rodgers admitted that he was originally upset with the song, but later declared it to be "one of his favorite songs of all time" and his favorite of all the tracks that sampled (or in this instance interpolated) Chic. He also stated: "As innovative and important as 'Good Times' was, 'Rapper's Delight' was just as much, if not more so."

A substantial portion of the early stanzas of the song's lyrics was borrowed by Jackson from Grandmaster Caz (Curtis Brown) who had loaned his 'book' to him—these include a namecheck for "Casanova Fly", which was Caz's full stage name. According to Wonder Mike, he had heard the phrase "hip-hop" from a cousin, leading to the opening line of "Hip-hop, hippie to the hippie, to the hip-hip-hop and you don't stop", whilst he described "To the bang-bang boogie, say up jump the boogie to the rhythm of the boogie, the beat" as "basically a spoken drum roll. I liked the percussive sound of the letter B". The line "Now what you hear is not a test, I'm rappin' to the beat", was inspired by the introduction to The Outer Limits ("There is nothing wrong with your television set. Do not attempt to adjust the picture").

Before the "Good Times" background starts, the intro to the recording is an interpolation of  "Here Comes That Sound Again" by British studio group Love De-Luxe, a disco hit in 1979.

According to Oliver Wang, author of the 2003 Classic Material: The Hip-Hop Album Guide, recording artist ("Pillow Talk") and studio owner Sylvia Robinson had trouble finding anyone willing to record a rap song. Most of the rappers who performed in clubs did not want to record, as many practitioners believed the style was for live performances only. It is said that Robinson and her son overheard Big Bank Hank in a pizza parlour. According to Master Gee, Hank auditioned for Robinson in front of the pizza parlor where he worked, whilst Gee himself auditioned in Robinson's car. A live band was used to record most of the backing track, including members of the group "Positive Force": Albert Pittman, Bernard Roland, Moncy Smith, and Bryan Horton.
 
Chip Shearin claimed during a 2010 interview that he was the bass player on the track. At the age of 17, he had visited a friend in New Jersey. The friend knew Robinson, who needed some musicians for various recordings, including "Rapper's Delight". Shearin's job on the song was to play the bass for 15 minutes straight, with no mistakes. He was paid $70 but later went on to perform with Sugarhill Gang in concert. Shearin described the session this way:
The drummer and I were sweating bullets because that's a long time. And this was in the days before samplers and drum machines, when real humans had to play things. ... Sylvia said, 'I've got these kids who are going to talk real fast over it; that's the best way I can describe it.'

Wang said:
There's this idea that hip-hop has to have street credibility, yet the first big hip-hop song was an inauthentic fabrication. It's not like the guys involved were the 'real' hip-hop icons of the era, like Grandmaster Flash or Lovebug Starski. So it's a pretty impressive fabrication, lightning in a bottle.

Chart performance
"Rapper's Delight" peaked at number 36 in January 1980 on the US Billboard Hot 100 chart, number four on the Billboard Hot Soul Singles chart in December 1979. The song was much more successful internationally, reaching number one on the Canadian Top Singles chart in January 1980, number one on the Dutch Top 40, and number three on the UK Singles Chart. In 1980, the song was the anchor of the group's first album The Sugarhill Gang.

It was the first top 40 song to be available only as a 12-inch extended version in the US. Early pressings (very few) were released with a red label, with black print, on Sugar Hill Records, along with a 7" 45rpm single (which is very rare). Later pressings had the more common blue label, in orange colored "roulette style" sleeves, fashioned after the label for Roulette Records; Roulette's Morris Levy and reputed mobster Tony Riviera had invested in Sugar Hill. Even later pressings were issued in the more common blue sleeves with the Sugarhill Records logo. In Europe, however, it was released on the classic 7-inch single format on French pop label Vogue, with a shorter version of the song. It was this 7" single that reached number one in the Dutch chart. The song ranked number 251 on Rolling Stone magazine's 2004 list of "500 Greatest Songs of All Time".

A British version of the song, with rewritten lyrics, was recorded for the song's 25th anniversary in 2004 by an ensemble of performers including Rodney P, Chester P, Kano, Simone, Yungun, Sway, J2K, Swiss, Baby Blue, Skibadee, Luke Skys, and MC D.

Music videos
The Sugar Hill Gang appeared on the syndicated Soap Factory Disco Show in late 1979, and their performance later became the song's official music video. The group's performance on the Palisades Park-based program demonstrates the significant overlap between early hip-hop and disco of the late 1970s.

Alternate music videos exist as well.  One appears to have been recorded by Dutch broadcasting company AVRO at a hotel pool in early 1980.

The theme was used in Cog, a car advert.

Personnel
 Michael "Wonder Mike" Wright – vocals
 Curtis "Grandmaster Caz" Brown – writer
 Henry "Big Bank Hank" Jackson – vocals
 Guy "Master Gee" O'Brien – vocals
 Bernard Roland or Chip Shearin – electric bass
 Albert Pittman or Brian Morgan – electric guitar
 Moncy Smith – piano
 Bryan Horton – drums
 Sylvia Robinson – additional vocals, vibraphone, and production
 Billy Jones – engineer
 Phil Austin – mastering, original US vinyl release

Charts

Weekly charts

Year-end charts

Certifications and sales

See also
List of 1970s one-hit wonders in the United States

References

External links
 
 Official Music Video
 Silver jubilee for first rap hit — BBC article about the single on its 25th anniversary
 The Story of Rapper's Delight by Nile Rodgers
 The 100 most important American musical works of the 20th century - NPR

1979 songs
1979 debut singles
American disco songs
Funk-rap songs
The Sugarhill Gang songs
Dutch Top 40 number-one singles
Number-one singles in Spain
RPM Top Singles number-one singles
Songs written by Bernard Edwards
Songs written by Nile Rodgers
Songs written by Sylvia Robinson
United States National Recording Registry recordings
Sugar Hill Records (Hip-Hop label) singles
LGBT-related songs
Sampling controversies
Songs about hip hop